Si Thoi, Phayao is a tambon (subdistrict) of Mae Chai District, in Phayao Province, Thailand. In 2014 it had a population of 7,038 people.

Administration

Central administration
The tambon is divided into 13 administrative villages (mubans).

Local administration
The area of the subdistrict is shared by two local governments.
the subdistrict municipality (thesaban tambon) Mae Chai (เทศบาลตำบลแม่ใจ)
the subdistrict municipality (thesaban tambon) Si Thoi (เทศบาลตำบลศรีถ้อย)

References

External links
Thaitambon.com on Si Thoi

Tambon of Phayao province
Populated places in Phayao province